MRTV-4 (Myanmar Radio and Television- 4) is a Burmese television channel jointly operated by MRTV and the Forever Group. Launched in May 2004, the channel broadcasts between 7am and 11pm. Since that time, it is only available to viewers with satellite or terrestrial DVB-T decoders. Now, they broadcast 24 hours and also available in OTT platform, PyonePlay.

The channel is run under the Ministry of Information, and international news broadcasts undergo censorship.

History
In May 2004, MRTV-4 was broadcast a two hours a day program schedule with the cooperation of Myanmar Radio and Television under the Ministry of Information. In 2005, they were broadcast a six hours a day program schedule and broadcast free to air for Yangon and neighboring areas in 2006, for Mandalay and neighboring areas in 2007. In April 2009, MRTV-4 channel was broadcasting 18 hours a day. MRTV-4 became a 24-hours a day in September 2010. In February 2014, they introduced the High-definition channel in 4TV network.

Programming

TV Show

Television Series

See also
 Media of Burma
 Communications in Burma
 MRTV
 MITV
 Channel 7

References

External links
 
 

Television channels in Myanmar
Television channels and stations established in 2004
2004 establishments in Myanmar